L-galactose 1-dehydrogenase (L-GalDH, L-galactose dehydrogenase) is an enzyme with the systematic name L-galactose:NAD+ 1-oxidoreductase. This enzyme catalyses the following chemical reaction:

 L-galactose + NAD+  L-galactono-1,4-lactone + NADH + H+

The enzyme catalyses a step in the ascorbate biosynthesis in higher plants.

References

External links 
 

EC 1.1.1